James "Jim" Elliott is a Scottish wheelchair curler.

At the national level he is a two-time Scottish wheelchair champion curler (2007, 2009).

Teams

References

External links 

Living people
Scottish male curlers
Scottish wheelchair curlers
Scottish wheelchair curling champions
Year of birth missing (living people)
Place of birth missing (living people)